Kulwant Khejroliya (born 13 March 1992) is an Indian cricketer. He made his List A debut for Delhi in the 2016–17 Vijay Hazare Trophy on 26 February 2017. Prior to his debut, he was bought by the Mumbai Indians team for the 2017 Indian Premier League for 10 lakhs.

He made his first-class debut for Delhi in the 2017–18 Ranji Trophy on 6 October 2017. He made his Twenty20 debut for Delhi in the 2017–18 Zonal T20 League on 9 January 2018. Later the same month, he was bought by the Royal Challengers Bangalore in the 2018 IPL auction.

In October 2018, in the quarter-finals of the 2018–19 Vijay Hazare Trophy, he took a hat-trick for Delhi against Haryana, finishing with figures of six wickets for 31 runs from his ten overs. He was released by the Royal Challengers Bangalore ahead of the 2020 IPL auction.

References

External links
 

1992 births
Living people
Indian cricketers
Delhi cricketers
Royal Challengers Bangalore cricketers
Mumbai Indians cricketers
People from Jhunjhunu district